Goofy (Hangul: 구피) is a South Korean dance music and hip hop trio that debuted in 1996.

Discography

Studio albums

Singles 
 "Neo Goofy" (2008)
 "비야" (2009)
 "옛날 노래의 역습" (2016)

References 

K-pop music groups
Musical groups established in 1996
South Korean pop music groups